Balthazar is a French brasserie restaurant located at 80 Spring Street (between Broadway and Crosby Street) in SoHo in Manhattan, in New York City. It opened on April 21, 1997, and is owned by restaurateur Keith McNally.

McNally also owns Pastis, Cafe Luxembourg, Lucky Strike, the Russian-themed bar and restaurant Pravda, Odeon in Tribeca, and Schiller's Liquor Bar on the Lower East Side. Balthazar Bakery was later opened at 80 Spring Street.

McNally opened Balthazar in the theatre district in Covent Garden in London, in February 2013. Balthazar London will reside within a building known as The Flower Cellars, sharing the space with The London Film Museum. The general manager will be Byron Lang.

Description

Among its dishes are steak au poivre, steak frites, short ribs, beef stroganoff, duck confit, butternut squash, skate, and French onion soup (of which the brasserie serves 15 gallons daily). Balthazar typically serves around 1,500 guests a day, and by the far the most popular dish is steak frites; the restaurant can sell 200 per day, and out of the 200-odd employees, two full-time prep cooks are required just to handle potatoes for frying. It is also known for its raw bar. The head chef is Shane McBride, who was preceded by Lee Hanson and Riad Nasr.

The SoHo building that houses Balthazar used to be occupied by a tannery. Today, Balthazar is designed to imitate traditional brasserie atmosphere. It has high-backed red leather banquettes, scarred and peeling brass oversize mirrors, high tin ceiling, scuffed tiled floor, faded saffron yellow walls, large windows, and antique lighting. One reviewer wrote that two-thirds of the restaurant's appeal is atmospheric. The restaurant is loud and bustling, and seats 180 people.
 Balthazar is also known for celebrity-watching; in 2012, Fodor's ranked it # 1 in New York City in that category.

In 2013, Zagat's gave Balthazar a food rating of 24 (out of 30), a decor rating of 24, and ranked it the second best French brasserie restaurant in New York City. That year, the New York Daily News rated its French onion soup the second-best in the city.

Balthazar made headlines in 2022 when comedian and actor James Corden was banned from the restaurant by owner Keith McNally, after reportedly being "abusive" and "extremely nasty" to staff. The ban was later rescinded after Corden apologised to McNally in private and in public, admitting that he had been "ungracious."

In popular culture
Balthazar is featured in the 2009 autobiography Under the Table: Saucy Tales from Culinary School, by Katherine Darling (Simon and Schuster), in the 2010 novel The Associate, by John Grisham (Random House), in the 2010 novel Something Borrowed, by Emily Giffin (Macmillan), in the 2010 novel 36 Arguments for the Existence of God: A Work of Fiction, by Rebecca Goldstein (Random House), in the 2011 juvenile fiction novel Holiday Spirit, by Zoe Evans (Simon and Schuster), in the 2011 autobiography Innocent Spouse: A Memoir, by Carol Ross Joynt (Random House),and in the 2012 novel The Stolen Chalice, by Kitty Pilgrim (Simon and Schuster). In November 1999, comedian and actor Jerry Seinfeld proposed to Jessica Sklar at Balthazar.

See also
 Jesse Dunford Wood, a chef at Balthazar

References

External links

1997 establishments in New York City
French-American culture in New York City
French restaurants in New York City
Restaurants established in 1997
Restaurants in Manhattan
SoHo, Manhattan